El Mansourieh ( translit. al-Manṣūriyyah) is a village in the Matn District of the Mount Lebanon Governorate, Lebanon. It is historically important because of the archaeological remains of a Roman aqueduct.

Overview

About 10 km east of Beirut, on a hilltop overseeing the capital, lies Mansourieh the gateway to Northern Matn.

Etymology

Manṣūr) meaning victorious, presumably dating back to a battle between the Crusaders and the Arabs in which the latter emerged victorious.

Geography

Mansourieh consists of the village, seated on top of a ridge, bordered to the south and southwest by a river, the Beirut River and to the north by the Mar Roukouz (St. Roches) ravine.
Upwards to the east Mansourieh merges with Ain Saadeh and Monte Verde, and slopes downhill westwards to Mkalles and Sin el-Fil.
Across the river to the southwest lies the Hazmieh town, part of the Baabda district.
Daychounieh covers the southeastern side, facing Baabda and Louaize
.

Mansourieh is 16 km to the Capital (Beirut), 16 km to the Province Administrative Center (Baabda) and 12 km to the Caza Administrative Center (Jdeideh).
Mansourieh slopes upwards from an elevation of approx. 200m to reach its highest at around 350m.

Until the early nineties of the last century, Mansourieh was mostly a rural area. Plains along the banks of the Beirut River were cultivated with citrus orchards. Olive groves were traditionally grown in more arid areas.
Pine forests covered the southeastern slopes. Vineyards and fig trees, along with other Mediterranean cultivars, completed the landscape.

Due to intensive urbanization since the second half of the last century, many green areas have been replaced by residential and commercial buildings.
Few green areas remain, mainly along the river bank.

Mansourieh lies on the main road running from Beirut through Sin el-Fil and Mkalles, winding up the mountain to reach Baabdat, Bikfaya and Upper Matn.
The 'Ras el-Matn' road connects Northern Matn to Southern Matn villages, starting from Monte Verde.

Mansourieh also has a great number of shops, restaurants and supermarkets. These are located namely in the old road (shops and bakeries) and the Mansourieh highway (food chains, retail shops and outlets). The highway is thus region with high mobility traffic. The old road on the other hand, offers a great view on Beirut along with trees and nice houses and buildings.

Beirut River flows east to west from Lebanon's mountains passing south of Mansourieh to the Mediterranean Sea.
The River is crossed by a dam locally called 'Jisr es-Sid' (Bridge of the Dam) built during the French mandate.
With the dam, part of the river water is diverted to irrigate the Hadath and Kfarshima coastal planes.
A bridge on top of the dam links Mansourieh to Hazmieh's Mar Takla and Mar Roukouz neighborhoods.

Mansourieh municipality administers the industrialized Mkalles zone and the Daychounieh village.

Demographics

As of 2009, Mansourieh houses a population of approx. 17,000 of whom 1,445 are voters and 2,254 native residents.
Residences number approximately 4,500
.

Education

Mansourieh is home to the following educational institutions:

 Eastwood College EWC
 Lebanese University, Literature 

In addition to the institutions found within village limit, several others are located a few kilometers around:

 Université Saint Joseph  (Mar Roukouz)
 Sagesse High School, Mary Mother of Wisdom  (Ain Saadeh)
 Lebanese University, Human Sciences  (Fanar)

Medical institutions

 Hospital Beit Al Ajouz (Mansourieh)
 Bellevue Medical Center  (Mansourieh)

Archaeological sites: Roman aqueduct

Located in the secluded river valley between Mansourieh and Hazmieh are the remains of a little-known Roman aqueduct.

During the Roman period, with the expanding urbanization of Beirut, the demand for running water outgrew the capacity of the existing wells and springs.
The solution was to get water from one of the springs located along the Beirut River.
The nearest spring was the Daychounieh source, situated 20 km southeast of Beirut.
The Roman architects built a water channel to convey this water across the Beirut River and transport it onwards to Beirut.

It was built over an arched, bridge-like structure known today as 'Qanater es-Sett Zubaida' (The Arches of Mistress Zubaida).
The aqueduct consisted of a series of arches of which only a small number remains on the sides of the river.

It was built in 273 AD, during the reign of Roman emperor Aurelian and was also used as a way station for the Roman military in Lebanon.
The name Zubaida can be identified with the famous al-Zabba'/Bat-Zabbai/Zenobia of Palmyra, who may have built it.
It can also be associated with Princess Zubaida, wife of caliph Haroun ar-Rashid.
Curiously, another Roman aqueduct on the Nahr Ibrahim (Adonis river) bears the same name.

Religion

Mansourieh native inhabitants are Christians predominantly Greek Orthodox. Population influx in the last 20 years diversified the religious panorama to include Maronites and other Christian denominations.

Churches

 Mar Elias (Saint Elijah Church) – Greek Orthodox (Mansourieh)
 Miled Es-Saydeh  (Saint Mary Church) – Greek Orthodox (Mansourieh)
 Mar Gergis (Saint George Church) – Maronite (Daychounieh)
 St. Thérèse  (Sainte Thérèse Church) – Maronite (Ain Saadeh-Beit Mery)
 Mar Elias (Saint Elijah Church) – Greek Orthodox (Mkalles)
 Mar Elias (Saint Elijah Church) – Maronite (Mkalles)

References and footnotes

External links
Mansouriyeh - Mkalles - Daychouniyeh, Localiban
 Mansourieh on the Net

Populated places in the Matn District
Archaeological sites in Lebanon
Roman sites in Lebanon
Roman aqueducts outside Rome